During the early days of the COVID-19 pandemic, the disease and virus were sometimes called "coronavirus", "Wuhan coronavirus", or "Wuhan pneumonia".

In January 2020, the World Health Organization (WHO) tentatively named it "2019-nCoV", short for "2019 Novel Coronavirus", or "2019 Novel Coronavirus Acute Respiratory Disease". This naming was based on the organization's 2015 guidelines for naming novel viruses and diseases, avoiding the use of geographic locations (such as Wuhan), in part to prevent social stigma. A similar structure has also been used by the AP when referring to virus variants, for example, referring to it as the "Delta variant" rather than the "South African variant".

On 11 February 2020, the WHO named the disease COVID-19 (short for coronavirus disease 2019). That same day, the International Committee on Taxonomy of Viruses (ICTV) formally announced it had named the causative virus as SARS-CoV-2 (severe acute respiratory syndrome coronavirus 2) based upon its genetic similarity to the 2003 SARS-CoV. WHO Director General Tedros Adhanom Ghebreyesus explained that CO stands for coronavirus, VI for virus, and D stands for disease, while 19 stands for the year that the outbreak was first detected. The separation between the disease and the causative virus is based on the same nomenclature policies that separate AIDS and the virus which causes it, HIV.

Chinese virus 
From January to March 2020, US President Donald Trump repeatedly described the virus as the "Chinese virus". In March 2020, the president claimed to have abandoned the term, telling Fox News "we shouldn't make any more of a big deal out of it". On March 18 and 19 2020, Trump twice defended using the term "Chinese virus" amid instances of bigotry against Asians in the USA. Trump referred to it as "the China Virus" at least as late as January 2021.

CCP virus 

The Epoch Times has reportedly funded right-wing groups promoting the use of the term "CCP virus" to lay blame on the Chinese Communist Party (CCP) for the pandemic. Chinese-born New Zealand sculptor Chen Weiming created a 20-foot statue in Liberty Sculpture Park in Yermo, California, depicting Chinese leader and CCP general secretary Xi Jinping with spike proteins as his hair, naming it "CCP virus".

Stylization
Stylization of the term has varied since the virus' and disease's discovery. The World Health Organization (WHO) stylizes the disease as COVID-19 with all letters capitalized and many other organizations have followed their lead. The AP Stylebook, Chicago Manual of Style, and the Modern Language Association (MLA) have styled it similarly. Several observers have noted the importance of proper stylization, despite the seeming ridiculousness of worrying over such matters "at a time like this" (during the early days of the pandemic), recalling the confusion and prejudice which resulted from unclear or inconsistent naming as was the case with AIDS (which was called GRID/HTLV-III/LAV at various times) and non-A, non-B Hepatitis. They have also pointed out that future researchers will benefit from consistency when reviewing past data and research.

However, stylization as "Covid-19" has become common as well. Numerous news sources including The New York Times, CNN, Politico, The Wall Street Journal, NBCNews have presented the term with a capital C but all other letters as lower case. As a result, use of "Covid-19" has become commonplace and even the accepted standard in some cases. Use of "Covid-19" in news sources from the United Kingdom like The Guardian has also been the norm since most British newspapers only capitalize an entire acronym if the acronym is typically spelled out like "B-B-C" or "N-H-S" while acronyms which are pronounced as words, like "Nasa" or "Unicef" have their first letter capitalized and all subsequent letters lowercase.

While COVID-19 refers to the disease and SARS-CoV-2 refers to the virus which causes it, referring to the "COVID-19 virus" has been accepted. Reference to SARS-CoV-2 as "the coronavirus" has become somewhat accepted despite such use implying that there is only one coronavirus species. Similarly, use of "COVID" for the disease (if the first rendered as COVID-19) has been tolerated. Use of "the Coronavirus" to refer to the COVID-19 pandemic which began in December 2019 has also been accepted. Although such use does not specify the year or which coronavirus-related disease is being referred to, given its all-encompassing impact at the time, such references have been deemed justifiable. Use of "the" when referring to the disease, virus, or 2019 pandemic has been quite varied with some requiring use of "the" while others have not. The Oxford English Dictionary noted that "the" is typically not used when referring to the disease, COVID-19, but is not uncommon when referring to the virus.

Reference to the virus and/or the disease as "corona", "the corona", and "the rona" has also arisen in various parts of the world.

See also  
 Virus classification

References 

COVID-19
classification
Medical classification
History of medicine